The 2014–15 Denver Pioneers men's basketball team represented the University of Denver during the 2014–15 NCAA Division I men's basketball season. The Pioneers, led by eighth year head coach Joe Scott, played their home games at Magness Arena and were members of The Summit League. They finished the season 12–18, 6–10 in Summit League play to finish in a tie for sixth place. They lost in the quarterfinals of The Summit League tournament to North Dakota State.

Roster

Schedule

 
|-
!colspan=9 style="background:#880029; color:#D0CCAE;"| Regular season

|-
!colspan=9 style="background:#880029; color:#D0CCAE;"| The Summit League tournament

References

Denver Pioneers men's basketball seasons
Denver